BioCurious is a community biology laboratory and nonprofit organization located in Sunnyvale, California, co-founded by Eri Gentry, Kristina Hathaway, Josh Perfetto, Raymond McCauley, Joseph Jackson, and Tito Jankowski. With the help of Kickstarter and 239 backers they raised $35,319. BioCurious is a complete working laboratory and technical library for entrepreneurs to access equipment, materials, and co-working space, and a meeting place for citizen scientists, hobbyists, activists, and students. Scientific American magazine has described BioCurious as "one of country’s premier community biotechnology labs [...]".

The lab debuted on Kickstarter in 2010 and raised $35,319 from backers, and opened in October 2011. BioCurious has supported projects including a 3D Bioprinter, glow-in-the-dark plants. In 2016 BioCurious partnered with The Tech Museum of Innovation in San Jose to host Geektoberfest for beer enthusiasts, beer brewers, and scientists to learn the biology of beer with talks, demos and beer tastings.

BioCurious is part of a thriving bioeconomy and is active in promoting the role of community biology labs innovation and entrepreneurship. BioCurious is part of the international conversation about how biology will fundamentally change our world, and has attended White House Makerspace meetings that highlight the growing importance of DIY spaces in the economy. Part of this role is in providing space and resources for both early-stage startup companies or interested students and holds its own ambitious community group projects, such as real vegan cheese (in collaboration with Counter Culture Labs), the DIY bioprinter project, microfluidics, and consulting on discussions in biosecurity.

References

Further reading

External links
 Official website
 BioCurious on Meetup.com
 BioCurious Google Group
 BioCurious on Hackerspaces.org

Organizations based in California